Villa Sandino is a municipality in the Chontales Department of Nicaragua.

Jose Dolores Quesada Cornejo and Astorga family was one of the recognized family in Villa sandino, others like Aragones, Duartes, Arguellos.

Municipalities of the Chontales Department